Nicholas Andrew Awford (born 15 April 1995) is an English footballer who plays for Baffins Milton Rovers as a central midfielder.

Club career

Portsmouth
Awford was born in Portsmouth, and began his footballing career at Portsmouth's Academy.

On 9 February 2011, Awford signed a two-year scholarship deal with Pompey. Although he then spent most of the 2012–13 season with the Academy (managed by his father, Andy Awford), Nick Awford was promoted to the first team squad on 6 April 2013. He was named among the substitutes in a 0–0 draw against Stevenage, but he did not leave the bench. He was also on the bench in the following weekend, in a 3–2 away loss against Brentford.

Awford made his Portsmouth debut on 20 April, replacing Johnny Ertl in the dying minutes of a 3–0 home win against Sheffield United. It was his maiden appearance of the campaign.

On 30 August, Awford was loaned to Gosport Borough, in a one-month deal. Two months later, he joined Chelmsford City on the same terms.

On 27 February 2015, after having another temporary spell at Bognor Regis Town, Awford was released by Portsmouth.

Havant & Waterlooville
A day after being released by Pompey, Awford joined Havant & Waterlooville in a permanent deal until the end of the season.

Career statistics

References

External links
 
 

1995 births
Living people
Footballers from Portsmouth
English footballers
Association football midfielders
English Football League players
National League (English football) players
Portsmouth F.C. players
Gosport Borough F.C. players
Chelmsford City F.C. players
Bognor Regis Town F.C. players
Havant & Waterlooville F.C. players
Farnborough F.C. players
Winchester City F.C. players
Petersfield Town F.C. players
Baffins Milton Rovers F.C. players